Banahaw tree mouse (Musseromys gulantang) is a species of rodent in the family of Muridae. It is named after Mount Banahaw in Luzon, Philippines.

References

Heaney, L.R.; Balete, D.S.; Rickart, E.A.; Veluz, M.J.; Jansa, S.A. 2009. Chapter 7. A New Genus and Species of Small ‘Tree-Mouse’ (Rodentia, Muridae) Related to the Philippine Giant Cloud Rats. Bulletin of the American Museum of Natural History 331: 205–229.

Musseromys
Mammals described in 2009
Mammals of the Philippines
Endemic fauna of the Philippines